is a railway station owned by Kintetsu Corporation in Katsuragi, Nara Prefecture, Japan.

Lines 
 Kintetsu Railway
 Minami Osaka Line (F23)
 Gose Line (P23)

Layout 
 2 island platforms serving 4 tracks are located on the ground.  The ticket gates and the ticket machines are located on the overbridge over the platforms and the tracks. Extending from Track 4, a storage track is located in the west of the station for Gose Line shuttle trains.

Adjacent stations 

|-
!colspan=5|Kintetsu

References

Railway stations in Japan opened in 1898
Railway stations in Nara Prefecture